Andra decennier is a Björn Skifs studio album, consisting of covers of old songs. The album was released on 22 November 2006.

Track listing
Södermalm
Säg det i toner
Alla har vi varit små
Säg hur har du det med kärleken idag
Räkna de lyckliga stunderna blott
Alla säger att jag ser så ledsen ut
Violen från Flen
Allt detta och himlen därtill
På en liten smutsig bakgård
Solen lyser även på liten stuga
Sång om syrsor
En liten smula kärlek

Contributors
Björn Skifs - vocals
Peter Milefors - drums, percussion
Bosse Persson - bass
Magnus Bengtsson - harp
Bengt Palmers - producer
Hans Gardemar - grand piano, percussion, keyboard, producer
Stockholm Session Strings - musicians

Charts

Weekly charts

Year-end charts

References 

2006 albums
Björn Skifs albums
Swedish-language albums